Elizabeth Elizah (born 9 January 1996) is a Papua New Guinean footballer who plays as a midfielder. She has been a member of the Papua New Guinea women's national team.

References

1996 births
Living people
Women's association football midfielders
Papua New Guinean women's footballers
Papua New Guinea women's international footballers